The 1996 Tour de Hongrie was the 25th edition of the Tour de Hongrie cycle race and was held from 9 to 14 July 1996. The race started and finished in Budapest. The race was won by Andrej Tolomanov.

General classification

References

1996
Tour de Hongrie
Tour de Hongrie